Mekane Selam Airport  is an airport serving Mekane Selam, a town in the Debub Wollo (or "South Wollo") zone of the Amhara region in central Ethiopia.

References

External links
 

Airports in Ethiopia
Amhara Region